Jared Benko is the current director of athletics for Georgia Southern University. He previously served as 
deputy athletic director for Mississippi State University, as assistant athletic director for Auburn University, and in various administrative positions for the University of Arkansas and the University of Georgia. Benko attended college at the University of Georgia, where he graduated with a bachelor's degree in sports studies in 2005, and a master's degree in public administration in 2007. Benko was named athletic director at Georgia Southern University on March 5, 2020.

References

External links
 

Living people
People from Watkinsville, Georgia
Georgia Southern Eagles athletic directors
University of Georgia alumni
Year of birth missing (living people)